is a Japanese actress and model. She is best known for her acting. Some of her work includes Black Rain, Evil Dead Trap, Fruits of Passion, G.I Samurai, Black Angel Vol. 1, and The Man Behind the Scissors.

Biography

Filmography

References

External links 
Official Promotional Page

Japanese actresses
Living people
1959 births